The Civil Engagement group  is a technical group in Seanad Éireann (the upper house of the Oireachtas or parliament of Ireland) composed of senators with a background in civic engagement organisations.

History 
The group was established in May 2016 after the election of the 25th Seanad, initially by independent senators Alice Mary Higgins, Frances Black, Lynn Ruane and John Dolan, along with Grace O'Sullivan of the Green Party. Colette Kelleher joined the group after being nominated to the Seanad by the Taoiseach, Enda Kenny. All six were first-time senators. O'Sullivan said the group members "share an activist background and will be pursuing progressive policy".

The Civil Engagement group is separate from the "Independent group", a technical group long established within the Seanad.

Seanad technical groups do not mirror those in the Dáil; while O'Sullivan joined the Civil Engagement group in the 25th Seanad, in the 32nd Dáil, for example, Green Party TDs sat with the Social Democrats to form a group for speaking time.

Three of the six members of the technical group did not return to the 26th Seanad, beginning with the Green Party's O'Sullivan election to the European Parliament in the 2019 European Parliament elections for the South constituency. Dolan was not re-elected, and Kelleher did not seek re-election. Taoiseach's nominee Eileen Flynn joined the group on her appointment, bringing the group's parliamentary representation up to four.

Composition

25th Seanad 
The following senators were members of the Civil Engagement group in the 25th Seanad:
 Alice Mary Higgins (leader)
 Frances Black
 Lynn Ruane
 John Dolan
 Grace O'Sullivan
 Colette Kelleher

26th Seanad 
The following senators are members of the Civil Engagement group in the 26th Seanad:
 Alice Mary Higgins (leader)
 Frances Black
 Eileen Flynn
 Lynn Ruane

References

Politics of the Republic of Ireland

2016 establishments in Ireland
Technical parliamentary groups